Spójnia Stargard, also known as shortly Spójnia, is a professional Polish basketball team based in Stargard, Poland, currently playing in the Polish Basketball League (PLK), the highest tier in Polish basketball. In 2018, they gained promotion from the I Liga.

Spójnia hosts its games at the Hala Miejska.

History
In May 2018, Spójnia promoted to the PLK after winning the I Liga championship as the team beat Sokół Łańcut 3–0 in the playoff finals. In its debut 2018–19 season, the team finished as 13th with a 9–21 record.

In the 2019 offseason, PGE Polska Grupa Energetyczna became main sponsor of the team which was re-named PGE Spójnia. In the 2020–21 season, Spójna reached the final of the 2021 Polish Basketball Cup. The team lost the final 86–73 to Zielona Góra in Lublin.

Honours

Polish Basketball Cup
Runners-up (1): 2021
I Liga
Champions (1): 2017–18

Players

Current roster

Notable players

 Rashid Atkins
 Anthony Hickey
/ Joe McNaull
 Shawn Respert
 Kelvin Upshaw
 Keith Williams

Notable coaches
 Tadeusz Aleksandrowicz
 Grzegorz Chodkiewicz

Arena

This multi-purpose indoor arena was opened in 1989. Basketball games can be watched by 2,500 spectators. Hala Miejska is part of a bigger complex which consists of hotel and restaurant.

References

Basketball teams in Poland
Basketball teams established in 1949
Sport in West Pomeranian Voivodeship
Stargard County